The  was an army of the Imperial Japanese Army during the final days of World War II.

History
The Japanese 52nd Army was formed on April 7, 1945, under the Japanese 12th Area Army as part of the last desperate defense effort by the Empire of Japan to deter possible landings of Allied forces in central Honshū during Operation Downfall. The Japanese 52nd Army was based in Sakura, Chiba Prefecture and was thus intended to guard the closest beachhead to Tokyo and the Kantō region along the Bōsō Peninsula. It consisted mostly of poorly trained reservists, conscripted students and Volunteer Fighting Corps home guard militia. It was demobilized at the surrender of Japan on August 15, 1945, without having seen combat.

List of Commanders

References

External links

52
Military units and formations established in 1945
Military units and formations disestablished in 1945